The Caliphate of Hamdullahi (also: Dina of Massina, Sise Jihad state) commonly known as the Massina empire (also spelled Maasina or Macina) was an early nineteenth-century Fulbe Jihad state centered in the Inner Niger Delta area of what is now the Mopti and Ségou Regions  of Mali.  Its capital was at Hamdullahi.

History

The Fulas of the region had for centuries been the vassals of larger states, including the Mali Empire (13th-14th centuries), the Songhai Empire (15th century), the Moroccan pashas of Tomboctou (16th century), and the Bambara Empire at Ségou (17th century).

By the early 1800s, many of these larger states had declined in power and inspired by the recent Muslim uprisings of Usman dan Fodio in nearby Hausaland, preacher and social reformer Seku Amadu began efforts at increasing religious revivals in his homeland. Early struggle created the Massina leadership and in 1818 Seku Amadu led a jihad against the Bambara Empire in 1818. The empire expanded rapidly, taking Djenné in 1819 and establishing a new capital at Hamdullahi in 1820.

At the height of the Empire's power, a 10,000 man army was stationed in the city, and Seku Amadu ordered the construction of six hundred madrasas to further the spread of Islam.  Alcohol, tobacco, music and dancing were banned in accordance with Islamic law, while a social welfare system provided for widows and orphans. A strict interpretation of Islamic injunctions against ostentation led Amadu to order the Great Mosque of Djenné to be abandoned, and all future mosques were ordered built with low ceilings and without decoration or minarets.

One of the most enduring accomplishments was a code regulating the use of the inland Niger delta region by Fula cattle herders and diverse farming communities.

In 1825, Seku Amadu conquered Timbuktu. According to the Nigerian historian J. F. Ade Ajayi, the Massina Empire "dominated the area of the 
Niger bend until its incorporation into al-Hadjdj 'Umar's empire, which stretched from the headwaters of the Senegal and Gambia rivers to Timbuktu." Amedu died in 1845, leaving control of the Massina Empire to his son, Amadu II, who was succeeded by his son Amadu III.

In 1862, Omar Tall of Toucouleur launched an attack on the Massina from his newly secured base at Ségou.  After a series of bloody battles, he entered Hamdullahi on March 16, leveling it.  Amadu III was captured and put to death.  Though resistance briefly continued under Amadu III's brother Ba Lobbo, the destruction marked the effective end of the Massina Empire.

List of rulers
Names and dates taken from John Stewart's African States and Rulers (1989).

Masina founded in c. 1400 by the Fulanis.

Rulers from 1814 to 1873, except for Tukolor regents, used the title of 'Sheikh'

See also
Mademba Sy

References

Further reading

External links
Nineteenth Century Timeline of Western and Central Sudan
History of Mali (French language)

 
Former empires in Africa
Countries in precolonial Africa
Political history of Mali
French West Africa
1818 establishments in Africa